Robert Gaskins was one of the creators of PowerPoint, and an expert and author on the history of the English concertina.

Education and professional work  

Gaskins was educated in Computer Science at University of California, Berkeley, and subsequently did interdisciplinary graduate study in literature and computing.

In the early 1980s Gaskins worked five years as manager of computer science research at Bell Northern Research, an international telecommunications R&D laboratory in Silicon Valley.
Subsequently, he joined Forethought, Inc., where the development of PowerPoint was begun.  

Gaskins was the entrepreneur behind the development of PowerPoint, later known as Microsoft PowerPoint after acquisition by Microsoft in the early 1990s.  Lee Gomes wrote in The Wall Street Journal:

Many original documents written by Robert Gaskins during the early history of PowerPoint's strategy and development are online for public access.

After leaving Microsoft, Gaskins became somewhat renowned as an expert on the history of the English concertina.

References

External links 
 

American computer businesspeople
Microsoft employees
Nortel employees
University of California, Berkeley alumni
University of Southern California alumni
Los Angeles City College alumni
1943 births
Living people
20th-century American inventors